Deshamanya Matharage Rita Genevieve Fernando, better known by her stage name Latha Walpola, is a prominent Sri Lankan vocal artist. It was during when Walpola was a member of a church choir, that she began a career that led to her becoming one of Sri Lanka's premier singers of her day. Today her fans often refer to her as "The Nightingale of Sri Lanka"

Personal life

Walpola was born on 11 November 1934  in Mt Lavinia Colombo, to Joseph Fernando and Elizabeth Muriel. She was one of five children. Her mother, who was a teacher encouraged her daughter to become a vocal artist. Walpola received her primary education at St. Anthony College in Dehiwala-Mount Lavinia, wherein she led the church choir.

She married Dharmadasa Walpola in 1959, later becoming known as Latha Walpola. A ceremonial wedding was held at Siri Kotha, Kollupitiya with a large gathering of guests and artists. The local police had to deploy extra men to control the massive crowd gathered outside Siri Kotha. The couple has three sons and a daughter. In the 1960s and early part of the 1970s, the couple became very popular.

Career
Latha Walpola just was 12 years old when she was introduced to the country by Radio Ceylon as a member of Radio Ceylon's Choir in 1946. C.A. Fonseka, a family friend and radio, dramatist, brought her to Radio Ceylon to perform in his Sarala Gee programme with his son C.D. Fonseka.

In 1947 Walpola sang her first solo song, "Kandulu Denethe Vehena", with lyrics by Sarath Wimalaweera and music composed by Vincent de Alwis, the resident violinist at Radio Ceylon. She then began to sing under the direction of Mohammed Gauss, P.L.A.Somapala and B.S.Perera, with these famous musicians incorporating her high-pitched tone into their musical creations. By 1950 she was a well-known female singer in the country, covering the songs "Sukomala Banda Lelawa", "Dunhinda Helena" and "Diyaluma Helena", originally sung by Chitra Somapala. Walpola has recorded for both the Columbia and HMV record labels. The song "Malbara Himidiriye Pipune Esala Araliya Mala", sung with C.T. Fernando, is one of her most popular songs. Her most popular songs were composed by Dr Premasiri Khemadasa who appreciated her voice and singing capabilities. At the age of 86, she has sung a very melodious song to the music of Sarath de Alvis and the lyrics of the new lyricist Jude Prasanna.

Contribution to Sinhala Cinema
In 1952 she made her first contribution to the Sinhala Cinema as a playback singer for the film, "Eda Rae", which was released in 1953, working on three other films during the same year.  She was able to make her debut in playback singing for three films with Dharmadasa Walpola during the same year. By 1958, Walpola had contributed to 22 films, going on to provide song tracks for nearly 600 films during her career.

Awards
Walpola was honoured by the Sri Lankan Government with the award of Kala Suri in 2005. In 2017 she was awarded the 2nd highest civil award, "Deshamanya", by the Sri Lankan Government. She has won the Sarasaviya Award, the most prestigious award presented to distinguished individuals involved with the Sinhala cinema, four times. In 2021, she was honoured with a lifetime achievement award during the ceremony held for 21 artists who made an invaluable contribution to Sinhala cinema in the early decades of Sinhala Cinema.

 The Deepasika Award in 1974.
 The Golden Swan Award in 1992.
 The Golden Conch Award in 1995.
 The Golden Jubilee Presidential Award for Pioneers of Film Industry in 1997.
 The Appreciation Award of OCIC in 2006.
 The U.W. Sumathipala Award in 2004.

See also
Cinema of Sri Lanka
Dharmadasa Walpola
Malani Bulathsinhala
Music of Sri Lanka
Radio Ceylon
Rukmani Devi
W.D. Amaradeva

Notes.
 Nightingale Of Sri Lanka - This title has been used for Rukmani Devi as well.

References.

External links
හෙළ ගීත කෝකිලාවට අසූවයි

1934 births
Living people
20th-century Sri Lankan women singers
Sinhalese singers
Sri Lankan Roman Catholics
Deshamanya
Kala Keerthi
Kala Suri